UFC Fight Night: Walker vs. Hill (also known as UFC Fight Night 201, UFC on ESPN+ 59 and UFC Vegas 48) was a mixed martial arts event produced by the Ultimate Fighting Championship that took place on February 19, 2022, at the UFC Apex facility in Enterprise, Nevada, part of the Las Vegas Metropolitan Area, United States.

Background
A lightweight bout between former UFC Lightweight Champion Rafael dos Anjos and Rafael Fiziev was expected to serve as the event headliner. However, the bout was postponed to UFC 272 due to visa issues with Fiziev. Instead, a light heavyweight bout between Johnny Walker and Jamahal Hill served as the main event.

Jim Miller and Nikolas Motta met in a lightweight bout at this event. They were originally booked for UFC Fight Night: Smith vs. Spann in last September, but Miller tested positive for COVID-19 a week before that event and was pulled from the contest.

John Makdessi was expected to face Nasrat Haqparast in a lightweight bout. However, Makdessi pulled out due to injury and the pairing was scrapped.

A heavyweight bout between Ilir Latifi and Alexander Romanov was expected to take place at the event. However, Romanov withdrew due to injury and the bout was scrapped.

A middleweight bout featuring Julian Marquez and Kyle Daukaus was scheduled for the event. However, Marquez was pulled from the event due to undisclosed reasons. He was replaced by Jamie Pickett and the contest took place at a catchweight of 195 pounds.

Austin Lingo and Jonathan Pearce were expected to meet in a featherweight bout. However, Lingo pulled out due to undisclosed reasons. He was replaced by Christian Rodriguez.

A bantamweight bout between Mario Bautista and Khalid Taha was scheduled for this event. However, Taha had to pull out of the bout due to undisclosed reasons and was replaced by promotional newcomer Jay Perrin.

At the weigh-ins, Gabriel Benítez weighed in at 148 pounds, 2 pounds over the featherweight non-title fight limit. His bout proceeded at a catchweight and he was fined 30% of his purse, which went to his opponent David Onama.

Results

Bonus awards
The following fighters received $50,000 bonuses.
Fight of the Night: No bonus awarded.
 Performance of the Night: Jamahal Hill, Kyle Daukaus, David Onama, and Stephanie Egger

See also 

 List of UFC events
 List of current UFC fighters
 2022 in UFC

References 

UFC Fight Night
2022 in mixed martial arts
February 2022 sports events in the United States
2022 in sports in Nevada
Mixed martial arts in Las Vegas
Sports competitions in Las Vegas